, popularly known as , is a Nichiren-shū Buddhist temple in Katsushika, Tokyo, Japan. Founded in 1629, the main image is of Taishakuten. In 1996 the Ministry of the Environment designated the temple and its ferryboat as one of the 100 Soundscapes of Japan. In 2009 the temple and its ferryboat were selected as one of the 100 Landscapes of Japan (Heisei era).

Access

Yagiri-no-Watashi
It costs 200 yen to travel from Shibamata Taishakuten to Yagiri-no-Watashi iriguchi bus stop for 5 minutes.

See also

Otoko wa Tsurai yo
Nichiren
Nichiren-shū
Shibamata Station
100 Soundscapes of Japan
100 Landscapes of Japan (Heisei era)

References

External links
 Shibamata Taishakuten Homepage

Buddhist temples in Tokyo
Katsushika
Nichiren-shū temples